By-elections to the 24th Canadian Parliament were held to fill vacancies in the House of Commons of Canada between the 1958 federal election and the 1962 federal election. The Progressive Conservative Party of Canada led a majority government for the 24th Canadian Parliament.

Fourteen vacant seats were filled through by-elections.

See also
List of federal by-elections in Canada

Sources
 Parliament of Canada–Elected in By-Elections 

1961 elections in Canada
1960 elections in Canada
1959 elections in Canada
1958 elections in Canada
24th